The Shark Master is a 1921 American drama film directed by Fred LeRoy Granville and written by George C. Hull and Fred LeRoy Granville. The film stars Frank Mayo, Doris Deane, Herbert Fortier, Oliver Cross, May Collins, and Bowditch M. Turner. The film was released on August 28, 1921, by Universal Film Manufacturing Company.

Cast         
Frank Mayo as McLeod Dean
Doris Deane as June Marstoon 
Herbert Fortier as Captain Marston
Oliver Cross as Donaldson
May Collins as Flame Flower
Bowditch M. Turner as Native Priest 
Nick De Ruiz as Native Chief
Karl Silvera as Moto

References

External links

1921 films
1920s English-language films
Silent American drama films
1921 drama films
Universal Pictures films
Films directed by Fred LeRoy Granville
American silent feature films
American black-and-white films
1920s American films